George Augustus Constantine Phipps, 2nd Marquess of Normanby  (23 July 1819 – 3 April 1890), styled Viscount Normanby between 1831 and 1838 and Earl of Mulgrave between 1838 and 1863, was a British Liberal politician and colonial governor of Nova Scotia, Queensland, New Zealand and Victoria.

Background
Normanby was born in London, the son of Constantine Phipps, 1st Marquess of Normanby, by his wife the Hon. Maria, daughter of Thomas Liddell, 1st Baron Ravensworth. He gained the courtesy title Viscount Normanby when his father succeeded as Earl of Mulgrave in 1831. When his father was made Marquess of Normanby in 1838, he became known by the courtesy title Earl of Mulgrave. Normanby entered the Coldstream Guards as an ensign, and became a lieutenant in 1838.

Political and administrative career
Normanby was returned to parliament for Scarborough in 1847, a seat he held until 1851 and again between 1852 and 1857. He was appointed Comptroller of the Household by Lord John Russell in 1851. When Lord Aberdeen became prime minister in early 1852, he became Treasurer of the Household, a post he held until 1858 the last three years under the premiership of Lord Palmerston. In the latter year he was appointed Governor of Nova Scotia, which he remained until 1863. In 1863 he also succeeded his father in the marquessate and took his seat in the House of Lords.

Normanby returned to the government in 1868 when he was appointed a Lord-in-waiting by William Ewart Gladstone. The following year he was promoted to Captain of the Honourable Corps of Gentlemen-at-Arms. In 1871 he became Governor of Queensland. He continued in this post until 1874, and was then Governor of New Zealand from 1874 to 1879 and Governor of Victoria from 1879 to 1884.

Family

Lord Normanby married Laura, daughter of Captain Robert Russell, R.N., in 1844. When he served as Lieutenant-Governor of Nova Scotia, he and his wife had the Prince of Wales (later King Edward VII) and his brother Prince Alfred, Duke of Edinburgh, as their guests at Government House. The couple had several children.
 Lady Constance Mary Phipps (d. 31 October 1883)
 Lady Laura Elizabeth Minnie Phipps (3 June 1845 – 12 October 1934); married John Vivian Hampton-Lewis (1835–1890) on 2 June 1868.
 Constantine Charles Henry Phipps, 3rd Marquess of Normanby (29 August 1846 – 25 August 1932); married Gertrude Stansfeld Forster on 30 December 1903, and had issue.
 Lord William Brook Phipps (13 August 1847 – 19 February 1880); married Constance Emma Keyser (d. 1932) on 31 March 1875, and had issue.
 Lady Katherine Louisa Phipps (1850 – 23 September 1926); married Francis Egerton, 3rd Earl of Ellesmere, and had issue.
 Lord Henry George Russell Phipps (26 January 1851 – 27 November 1905); married Norma Caroline Georgina Leith-Hay on 17 January 1878, and had issue.
 Lord Hervey Lepell Phipps (6 May 1854 – 21 April 1887); unmarried.

The Marchioness of Normanby died in London in January 1885, aged 69. Lord Normanby died at Brighton, Sussex, in April 1890, aged 70, and was succeeded by their eldest son, Constantine.

Arms

References

Directory of Royal Genealogical Data, Brian Tompsett, as of 1 March 2003;

External links 
 

Governors of Queensland
Governors of Victoria (Australia)
1819 births
1890 deaths
Scots Guards officers
Governors-General of New Zealand
Knights Grand Cross of the Order of the Bath
Knights Grand Cross of the Order of St Michael and St George
Members of the Privy Council of the United Kingdom
Mulgrave, George Phipps, Earl of
Mulgrave, George Phipps, Earl of Mulgrave
Mulgrave, George Phipps, Earl of Mulgrave
Mulgrave, George Phipps, Earl of Mulgrave
Mulgrave, George Phipps, Earl of Mulgrave
UK MPs who inherited peerages
Treasurers of the Household
Honourable Corps of Gentlemen at Arms
George
Colony of Victoria people
Colony of Queensland people
Governors of the Colony of Nova Scotia
2
British colonial governors and administrators in Oceania